Elmasburnu Nature Park is a nature park in Istanbul Province, Turkey.

Elmasburnu (literally "Cape Diamond") is situated east of Riva village in the north of Beykoz district in Istanbul Province on the coast of Black Sea. An area just south of the cape was declared a nature park by the Ministry of Environment and Forest in 2011.

See also
Polonezköy Nature Park, in Beykoz

References

Nature parks in Turkey
Protected areas established in 2011
2011 establishments in Turkey
Parks in Istanbul
Beykoz